Grnčar (Albanian: Gerçar) is a village in the municipality of Gusinje, Montenegro. It is located close to the Albanian border.

Demographics
According to the 2011 census, its population was 180.

References

Populated places in Gusinje Municipality